The 1680s decade ran from January 1, 1680, to December 31, 1689.

References